Kongelige Kammersangere or The Royal Chamber Singer is a prestigious award given to Danish Opera singers by the monarch. Only about 50 people have received the award since it was started in 1700. The first non-native Danish person who was appointed as a royal chamber singer was the Italian Giuseppe Siboni, who in 1819 received Danish citizenship and became director of the Royal Theatre.

Presented by Frederik VI 
 ca. 1819 – Giuseppe Siboni (1780–1839)
 ca. 1821 – Josephine Fröhlich (1803–1878)

Presented by Christian VIII 
 1841 – Ida Henriette da Fonseca (1802–1858)
 1843 – Catharine Simonsen (née Rysslander, 1816–1849)

Presented by Frederik VII 
 1854 – Jørgen Christian Hansen (1812–1880)
 1858 – Leocadie Gerlach (1827–1919, née Bergnehr)

Presented by Christian IX 
 1864 – Charlotte Bournonville (1832–1911)
 1866 – Peter Schram (1819–1895)
 1874 – Niels Juel Simonsen (1846–1906)
 1879 – Anna Henrietta Levinsohn (1839–1899)
 1888 – Elisabeth Dons (1864–1942)
 1894 – Sophie Keller (née Rung, 1850–1929)
 1901 – Vilhelm Herold (1865–1937)

Presented by Frederik VIII 
 1906 – Ellen Beck (1873–1953)
 1906 – Emilie Ulrich (1872–1952)
 1907 – Peter Cornelius (née Cornelius Petersen, 1865–1934)
 1907 – Helge Nissen (1871–1926)
 1907 – Ida Møller (1872–1947)
 1908 – Johanne Krarup-Hansen (1870–1958)

Presented by Christian X 
 1914 – Tenna Kraft (née  Frederiksen, 1885–1954)
 1915 – Margrethe Lendrop (née Boeck, 1873–1920)
 1916 – Johanne Brun (da) (née Prieme, 1874–1954)
 1917 – Albert Høeberg (1879–1949)
 1918 – Niels Hansen (1880–1969)
 1919 – Ingeborg Nørregaard Hansen (1874–1941)
 1922 – Lilly Lamprecht (1886–1976)
 1930 – Lauritz Melchior (1890–1973)
 1931 – Ingeborg Steffensen (1888–1964)
 1931 – Poul Wiedemann (1890–1969)
 1934 – Holger Byrding (1891–1980)
 1934 – Holger Bruusgaard (1884–1968)
 1934 – Else Schøtt (1895–1989)
 1934 – Per Biørn (1887–1944)
 1936 – Helge Rosvaenge (1897–1972)
 1939 – Einar Nørby (1896–1983)
 1941 – Ebba Wilton (1896–1951)
 1941 – Ely Hjalmar (1892–1952)
 1946 – Marius Jacobsen (1894–1961)
 1946 – Thyge Thygesen (1904–1972)
 1946 – Else Brems (1908–1995)
 1946 – Edith Oldrup (1912–1999)

Presented by Frederik IX 
 1947 – Henry Skjær (1899–1991)
 1949 – Stefan Islandi (1907–1993)
 1949 – Dorothy Larsen (1911–1990)
 1950 – Erik Sjøberg (1909–1973)
 1950 – Lilian Weber Hansen (1911–1987)
 1957 – Ruth Guldbæk (1924–2006)
 1959 – Otte Svendsen (1918–2008)

Presented by Margrethe II 
 1974 – Ib Hansen (1928–2013)
 1985 – Aage Haugland (1944–2000)
 1998 – Inga Nielsen (1946–2008)
 2006 – Stig Fogh Andersen (born 1950)
 2010 – Tina Kiberg (born 1958)

References

Opera terminology